Udaipur is a town in the Indian state of Madhya Pradesh near Ganj Basoda. It is the site of a well-preserved Śiva temple, a monument of national importance protected by the Archaeological Survey of India.

History
Udaipur's history reaches back to at least the ninth century, but it became famous and appears to have assumed its present name under the Paramāra king Udayāditya (c. 1060-87). It continued to be important in the 14th, 15th and 16th centuries, and was an important town on the north-south trade route.

Geography
Udaipur is located at 23°54'2"N 78°3'29"E.

Transport 
Udaipur is connected by bus service from Ganj Basoda railway station  93 km from Bhopal Junction towards Jhansi (203 km) and 604 km from New Delhi Jn.

Monuments

The monuments of Udaipur were first studied by M. B. Garde and published in the reports of the archaeological department of Gwalior state. The data in these reports was compiled into a list prepared in 1952.

Śiva temple

The most important temple at Udaipur is that dedicated to Śiva and known today as the Nīlakaṇṭheśvara. It was built in the second half of the eleventh century and is the only surviving royal temple of the Paramara kings. An inscription in the eastern porch records the building of the temple in Vikrama Saṃvat 1137 or 1080-81 CE. Architecturally, the temple spire belongs to a class known as bhūmija, or 'earth born,' a mode of temple building that originated in the Mālwa region.

The complex Śaiva iconography of the temple has been studied by Doria Tichit.

In the entrance porch of the temple are series of more than sixty votive records. Not yet studied in a systematic fashion, these form a continuous sequence from the time of the Paramāras – Devapāla (1218–39) is mentioned – through the period of the Tughluqs and beyond. For example, one inscription mentions a festival (yātrā) of the god Udaleśvara in 1338, the  same year as the Tughluq inscription recording the construction of the mosque in the temple precinct.

Tughluq Shahi mosque

Directly next to the temple is a small mosque constructed during the reign of Muhammad ibn Tughluq.  A pair of inscriptions record the building of this structure in AH 737 and 739 AH (i.e. 1336-37 and 1338-39 CE).

Islam Shah Suri mosque
A short distance to the south of the Shiva temple is a mosque with an inscription recording its construction in the time of Islam Shah of the Sur Dynasty in 1549. The inscription is placed directly over the mihrab. The shows the continued importance of Udaypur on the north-south route to the Deccan in the time of the Suri rulers. Despite its importance and uniqueness, the authorities have let the monument fall into ruins.

References

Cities and towns in Vidisha district